Nada Tunnel is a historic  long tunnel along Kentucky Route 77 in Powell County, Kentucky, in the United States. Formerly a railway tunnel, the tunnel has often been described as the "Gateway to Red River Gorge" for the shortcut it provides motorists to the Red River Gorge canyons of the Daniel Boone National Forest.

Built for the Dana Lumber Company between 1910 and 1911, Nada Tunnel (pronounced nay-duh by locals) was named from Nada, Kentucky, then a logging town about  past the tunnel's entrance.  Solid sandstone was blasted with dynamite and dug out with steam machinery and hand tools, with two teams working from each side of the ridge.

Once the forests had been cleared, the timber companies pulled out of the area. The railroad tracks were removed and a dirt road was laid in the unlit tunnel in order to accommodate horse and pedestrian traffic. Nada Tunnel has since been paved to carry a single lane of road traffic.

Nada Tunnel lends its name to two prehistoric Native American rock art sites, namely "Nada Tunnel 1 Petroglyphs" and "Nada Tunnel 2", which were listed on the National Register of Historic Places in 1992.

Myths and legends 
There is a local legend that the Nada Tunnel is haunted by a ghost of a former tunnel construction worker who perished when a stick of dynamite exploded when being thawed at a nearby fire.

Gallery

References

External links
 Video tour of Nada Tunnel

Buildings and structures in Powell County, Kentucky
Transportation infrastructure in Appalachia
Tunnels in Kentucky
1911 establishments in Kentucky
Tunnels completed in 1911
Road tunnels in the United States
Transportation in Powell County, Kentucky